Serra Negra Biological Reserve is a Biological reserve in the state of Pernambuco, Brazil.

History
Indigenous languages such as Huamoé were spoken in the Serra Negra.

It became part of the Caatinga Ecological Corridor, created in May 2006.

The reserve is in parts of the municipalities of Floresta, Inajá and Tacaratu in Pernambuco. It is administered by the Chico Mendes Institute for Biodiversity Conservation. Today, the purpose of the reserve is to fully preserve the biota without direct human interference other than actions to restore and preserve the natural balance, biological diversity and natural ecological processes.

Ecosystem

The Biological Reserve is classed as a "strict nature reserve" under IUCN protected area category Ia.

The reserve occupies the summit of an inselberg, or isolated elevation, and is an island of tropical rainforest in the Caatinga area.

Tree species include Libidibia ferrea, Copaifera trapezifolia and Tabebuia.
The grey-breasted parakeet (Pyrrhura griseipectus) is a protected species in the reserve.

References

Sources

1982 establishments in Brazil
Biological reserves of Brazil
Protected areas of Pernambuco
Protected areas established in 1982